Franklin is a city in Franklin County, Nebraska, United States. The population was 1,000 at the 2010 census. It is the county seat of Franklin County.

History
Franklin was founded in the 1870s. It was named for Benjamin Franklin.

Former Nebraska Governor, Ashton Shallenberger, collapsed and then died a few moments later while giving a speech in Franklin on February 22, 1938.

Geography
Franklin is located at  (40.095357, -98.953083).

Demographics

2010 census
As of the census of 2010, there were 1,000 people, 443 households, and 264 families living in the city. The racial makeup of the city was 98.4% White, 0.4% Native American, 0.1% Asian, 0.4% from other races, and 0.7% from two or more races. Hispanic or Latino of any race were 1.5% of the population.

There were 443 households, of which 25.1% had children under the age of 18 living with them, 48.8% were married couples living together, 8.4% had a female householder with no husband present, 2.5% had a male householder with no wife present, and 40.4% were non-families. 37.9% of all households were made up of individuals, and 25.5% had someone living alone who was 65 years of age or older. The average household size was 2.19 and the average family size was 2.89.

The median age in the city was 48.5 years. 23.4% of residents were under the age of 18; 5.1% were between the ages of 18 and 24; 17.4% were from 25 to 44; 26.6% were from 45 to 64; and 27.5% were 65 years of age or older. The gender makeup of the city was 45.8% male and 54.2% female.

2000 census
As of the census of 2000, there were 1,026 people, 440 households, and 272 families living in the city. The population density was 1,028.4 people per square mile (396.1/km). There were 498 housing units at an average density of 499.2 per square mile (192.3/km). The racial makeup of the city was 99.42% White, 0.39% Native American, 0.10% Asian, and 0.10% from two or more races. Hispanic or Latino of any race were 0.97% of the population.

There were 440 households, out of which 25.2% had children under the age of 18 living with them, 51.4% were married couples living together, 8.4% had a female householder with no husband present, and 38.0% were non-families. 36.8% of all households were made up of individuals, and 24.3% had someone living alone who was 65 years of age or older. The average household size was 2.18 and the average family size was 2.85.

Age spread:  22.8% under the age of 18, 4.1% from 18 to 24, 20.3% from 25 to 44, 20.1% from 45 to 64, and 32.7% who were 65 years of age or older. The median age was 48 years. For every 100 females, there were 76.3 males. For every 100 females age 18 and over, there were 73.3 males.

As of 2000 the median income for a household in the city was $27,315, and the median income for a family was $32,639. Males had a median income of $25,156 versus $16,739 for females. The per capita income for the city was $15,181. About 7.8% of families and 10.8% of the population were below the poverty line, including 13.7% of those under age 18 and 8.4% of those age 65 or over.

Notable people
 Frank W. Cyr, an educator known as "Father of the Yellow School Bus", was born in Franklin.
 Archie E. Mitchell - Christian missionary
 Clarence Mitchell - Major League Baseball pitcher

See also
 National Register of Historic Places listings in Franklin County, Nebraska

References

External links
 City of Franklin

Cities in Nebraska
Cities in Franklin County, Nebraska
County seats in Nebraska